Adamagan was an Aleut village, that at its peak was able to hold around 1000 people.  This site is one of the largest sites in the ancient Arctic.  The area has over 250 winter houses, summer houses, underground storage pits, and many more smaller structures.

The people made dugouts that they lived in.  It was covered by whale bones as well as some peat or sod that would keep any winds out.  The villagers lived on marine mammals they hunted with harpoons and bows and arrows.  They also buried offerings under their house, believing it helped protect them as well as improve their chances of success during hunting.

References
 

Aleut culture
Archaeological sites in Alaska
Former populated places in Alaska
Native American history of Alaska
Populated places in Aleutians East Borough, Alaska